Norbury & Pollards Hill is a ward in the London Borough of Croydon. It will elect 2 councillors, with the first election being held on 3 May 2018.

List of Councillors

Mayoral election results 
Below are the results for the candidate which received the highest share of the popular vote in the ward at each mayoral election.

Ward Results

The by-election was caused following the death of Councillor Maggie Mansell.

References 

Wards of the London Borough of Croydon